Prokhor of Gorodets (Прохор, Прохор с Городца in Russian) was a medieval Russian icon-painter, thought to have been the teacher of Andrei Rublev.

Together with Rublev and Theophanes the Greek, Prokhor painted a number of frescos in the old Cathedral of the Annunciation in the Moscow Kremlin in 1405 (the cathedral was rebuilt in 1416). Russian historians attribute a number of icons in the iconostasis of this cathedral to Prokhor, including "Crucifixion", "Ascension" and "Assumption", which can still be found in today's Cathedral of the Annunciation.

Russian painters
Russian male painters
15th-century painters
15th-century Russian people
Fresco painters